2-Methylglutaronitrile is the organic compound with the formula NCCH2CH2CH(CH3)CN. This dinitrile is obtained in the large-scale synthesis of adiponitrile. It is a colorless liquid with an unpleasant odor.  It is the starting compound for the vitamin nicotinamide and for the diester dimethyl-2-methylglutarate and the ester amide methyl 5-(dimethylamino)-2-methyl-5-oxopentanoate, which are promoted as green solvents. 2-Methylglutaronitrile is chiral but is mainly encountered as the racemate.

Occurrence and production
2-Methylglutaronitrile is a by-product of the production of adiponitrile, the precursor of hexamethylenediamine and adipic acid as building blocks for nylon 66.

Starting from 1,3-butadiene or a butadiene-rich C4-section (> 40% by volume) from a naphtha steamcracker in the first stage a mixture of pentenenitriles is obtained through hydrocyanation (using as catalyst Ni0-phosphine [PR3] or phosphite or phosphonite [P(OR)2R]). The mixture contains mainly trans-3-pentenenitrile in addition to the isomers 2-methyl-2-butenenitrile, 4-pentenenitrile and 2-pentenenitrile.

The mixture of monoolefinic C5 mononitriles is isomerized to 3- and 4-pentenenitrile with a hydrocyanation catalyst and a Lewis acid (such as ZnCl2). In the third step, the mixture is reacted with hydrogen cyanide to give a mixture of dinitriles which contains in addition to 2-methylglutaronitrile also adiponitrile and 2-ethylbutanedinitrile.

2-Methylglutaronitrile can be separated by fractional distillation.

The 2-methylglutaronitrile-rich fraction has hitherto been combusted as an undesired by-product of adiponitrile production, having the typical composition of about 86 wt% 2-methylglutaronitrile, 11 wt% 2-succinonitrile and 3 wt% adiponitrile.

Applications
2-methylglutaronitrile can be converted to 3-methylpyridine (β-picoline) by partial hydrogenation.

In addition to 3-methylpyridine, 3-methylpiperidine is obtained as a by-product from which further 3-methylpyridine can be obtained by dehydrogenation.

Ammonoxidation of 3-methylpyridine on transition metal contacts yields 3-cyanopyridine (nicotinonitrile) in yields of 95%.

Hydrogenation of a solution of 2-methylglutaronitrile in ethanol in the presence of Raney cobalt at 15 bar and 100 °C yields 2-methylpentane-1,5-diamine.

2-Methylpentanediamine can be converted to 3-methylpiperidine at 300 to 400 °C on a zeolite contact and then dehydrated on a palladium contact to 3-methylpyridine, which can be converted via nicotinonitrile into nicotinamide.

The racemic diamine can also be used for the preparation of specific polyamides and after reaction with phosgene to form 2-methylpentane diisocyanate as a reaction component in polyurethanes. Nitrilases regioselectively hydrolyze the ω-nitrile group in α, ω-dinitriles without detectable amide intermediate directly to the carboxyl group. 4-cyanopentanoic acid is formed in high yield.

The ammonium salt of 4-cyanopentanoic acid can be converted by catalytic hydrogenation in the presence of methylamine in 1,5-dimethyl-2-piperidone, an environmentally compatible solvent.

The hydrolysis of both nitrile groups of 2-methylglutaronitrile with e.g. 20% sodium hydroxide solution at 50 °C and subsequent acidification produces 2-methylglutaric acid.

Starting from 2-methylglutaronitrile the hydrolysis to 2-methylglutaric acid can also be accomplished via the 2-methylglutarimide obtained by heating a 2-methylglutaronitrile/water mixture to 275 °C in the presence of a titanium dioxide catalyst in yields of 94%.

Hydrolysis in the alkaline provides 2-methyl glutaric acid.

The reaction of 2-methylglutarimide with e.g. methanol (methanolysis) produces the diester dimethyl-2-methylglutarate in the presence of titanium dioxide or lanthanum oxide. It was commercialized as an environmentally friendly aprotic dipolar solvent under the name Rhodiasolv IRIS with the typical composition 87-89% dimethyl-2-methylglutarate, 9-11% dimethyl 2-ethylbutanedioate and 1-2% dimethyl hexanedioate as a substitute for acetone, dichloromethane, N-methylpyrrolidone and the like.

The ester mixture is very similar to so-called dibasic esters, which are commercially available as FlexiSolv DBE esters.

The diester can be selectively converted into a mixture of 1- or 5-substituted methyl ester amides with dimethylamine in methanol/sodium methoxide, which is used under the name Rhodiasolv Polarclean as formulation auxiliaries for crop protection preparations. The resulting ester amides are readily biodegradable and good solvents for a variety of different plant protection agents (such as insecticides or fungicides), also compared to the frequently used N-methylpyrrolidone, cyclohexanone or isophorone.

Other esteramides are derived, e. g. from 2-methylglutaronitrile which, after alkaline hydrolysis, is converted into 2-methylglutaric acid, cyclized with acetic anhydride to give 2-methylglutaric anhydride, reacted with dimethylamine to form the monoamide, reacted to an acid chloride with thionyl chloride and formed to an ester with more hydrophobic alcohols (like butanols or cyclohexanol).

References

Alkanedinitriles